Tricholochmaea is a genus of skeletonizing leaf beetles and flea beetles in the family Chrysomelidae. There are 21 described species and two subspecies of Tricholochmaea. It is treated as a synonym of Pyrrhalta by some authors, but not by others.

Species
 Tricholochmaea alni (Fall, 1924)
 Tricholochmaea cavicollis (J. L. LeConte, 1865) (cherry leaf beetle)
 Tricholochmaea decora (Say, 1824) (Pacific willow leaf beetle)
 Tricholochmaea kalmiae (Fall, 1924)
 Tricholochmaea perplexa (Fall, 1924)
 Tricholochmaea punctipennis (Mannerheim, 1843)
 Tricholochmaea ribicola (Brown, 1938)
 Tricholochmaea rufosanguinea (Say, 1826)
 Tricholochmaea sablensis (Brown, 1969)
 Tricholochmaea spiraeae (Fall, 1924)
 Tricholochmaea spiraeophila (Hatch in Hatch and Beller, 1932)
 Tricholochmaea tuberculata (Say, 1824)
 Tricholochmaea vaccinii (Fall, 1924) (blueberry leaf beetle)

References

Further reading

 
 

Galerucinae
Chrysomelidae genera